The Nissan S20 engine  was a straight-6 four-valve DOHC internal combustion engine produced by Nissan from 1969 to 1973, originally designed by engineers of the former Prince. It was the first mass-produced Japanese engines with more than two valves per cylinder.

The S20 powered Nissan's Skyline GT-R (C10 and C110) and Fairlady Z432 models.

This engine is not to be confused with the unrelated SR20 (consisting of the SR20Di, SR20DE, SR20DET, SR20VE, and SR20VET engines), which were straight-4 DOHC petrol engines from the SR series used in other Nissan models.

History

The S20 was one of the technical carryovers to the Nissan brand from Prince technology. Prince had been producing the Skyline since the model's inception in the 1950s; following the merger of the two companies, Nissan took over production of the Skyline, which received the new engine in the late 1960s.

The third generation Skyline was exhibited at the 1968 Tokyo Motor Show in October, which included a special "Skyline 2000GT Racing" model equipped with the S20; it was promoted as being equipped with the same engine as the R380. The production Skyline 2000GT-R (chassis code PGC10 for the four-door saloon) was introduced in February 1969, followed by the Skyline Hardtop 2000GT-R coupe (chassis code KPGC10, with a shortened wheelbase and 2 fewer doors) in 1970. The two models (PGC10/KPGC10) would later collectively win 49 straight Japan touring car victories between 1969 and 1971.

Aside from its use in the PGC10/KPGC10 Skylines, the S20 also was fitted to the Nissan Fairlady Z432, a sports racing model of the Nissan Fairlady Z (S30) line, starting in fall 1969. The Z432 designation was derived from the design of the S20: four valves per cylinder, three carburetors, and two overhead camshafts. In addition to the S20, changes in the Z432 version included a 5-speed manual transmission and a limited-slip differential. A special lightened variant was designated Z432R. The cost of the Z432 was nearly double the price of a standard Fairlady Z.

In September 1972, Nissan introduced the fourth generation Skyline (chassis code C110) powered by the L series of engines. A KPGC110 "Skyline 2000GT-R Racing Concept" powered by the S20 was shown at the 1972 Tokyo Motor Show after the commercial models were introduced; although the concept's number (73) hinted at Nissan's racing efforts for 1973, Nissan dropped its factory team that year in favor of developing anti-pollution technology and improving fuel efficiency. Less than 200 examples of the KPGC110 GT-R would be built from January through April 1973, due to increasingly stringent emissions laws; in addition, the contemporary oil crisis of that year created a wasteful perception of auto racing and high-performance vehicles by many people. Because of its rarity and withdrawal from touring car races, the KPGC110 Skyline GT-R has been dubbed as the "Phantom GT-R".

Engine specifications

The S20 is an inline-six with a cast iron block and aluminum head, using a 7-bearing crankshaft. It features a dual overhead cam, cross-flow head with pent-roof combustion chamber and four valves per cylinder. Heads were ported and polished manually, and the motors were bench tested for consistent power production before installation.

In addition, the valvetrain was driven by timing chains, rather than gears.

Most engines utilized triple Mikuni-Solex 40PHH dual-choke carburetors; models after 1969 offered optional Lucas mechanical fuel injection.

Applications
This engine was used in the following vehicles:
 Skyline GT-R (PGC10 type) 4-door sedan 1969 - 1970. (832 units)
 Skyline GT-R (KPGC10 type) 2-door coupe 1970 - 1972.  shorter wheelbase than the PGC10. (1,197 units)
 Skyline GT-R (KPGC110 type) January–April 1973. (197 units)
 Fairlady Z432 (PS30) 1969 - 1972. (419 – 420 units)
 Fairlady Z432R (PS30SB) Z432 race car-based for homologation nearly  lighter than production Z432. (30 – 50 units)

Motorsports
The first win for the S20-powered Skyline 2000GT-R was on May 3, 1969, at the TS-b race of the 1969 JAF Grand Prix held at Fuji Speedway, using the four-door PGC10; the winning car (No. 39, driven by T.Shinohara) has been preserved in the Nissan Heritage Collection. The racing saloons were joined by the hardtop coupe KPGC10 in March 1971 at the All Japan Suzuka Automobile Race. The PGC10/KPGC10 went on to win 49 consecutive races held at Fuji, Suzuka, Tsukuba, and Hokkaido; although the streak ended after the 49th win on October 10, 1971, the GT-R won its next race for its 50th victory on March 20, 1972, also held at the Fuji Circuit.

Compared to the Nissan L-series straight-six engines, the S20 was too small and too complex, despite it being a twin-cam with four valves per cylinder. In the 1970 All-Japan Fuji 1000km race, six Fairlady Z432R models with the S20 were entered, as well as one HS30 Fairlady 240Z with an L24. The L24-powered Fairlady 240Z won easily. Due to its simpler and more robust design, the L-series went on to become the most favored engine in motorsport and tuning, while the S20 remains relatively obscure.

See also
 Prince Motor Company
 Nissan Skyline GT-R
 List of Nissan engines

Notes

References

External links
  Detailed pictures of major components, taken during restoration.

S20
Straight-six engines
Gasoline engines by model